FSAI may refer to:
 Florida Student Association, Inc.
 Food Safety Authority of Ireland
 Fellow of the Society of Architectural Illustration
 Factorized Sparse Approximate Inverse, a kind of preconditioner, an application transformation procedure in linear algebra
 Fire and Security Association of India